Langaha is a small genus of elapoid snakes in the family Pseudoxyrhophiidae. The genus contains three species, all of which are endemic to Madagascar.

Species
There are three described species in the genus Langaha:
Langaha alluaudi  – southern leafnose snake
Langaha madagascariensis  – Madagascar leafnose snake
Langaha pseudoalluaudi

Etymology
The specific name, alluaudi, is in honor of French entomologist Charles Alluaud.

Taxonomy
The taxonomy of Langaha alluaudi and L. pseudoalluaudi is in need of revision.

References

Further reading
Bonnaterre [PJ] (1790). Tableau encyclopédique et methodique des trois Règnes de la Nature, Ophiologie. Paris: Panckoucke. xliv + 33–76. (Langaha, new genus, p. 71). (in French and Latin).
Glaw F, Vences M (1994). A Fieldguide to the Amphibians and Reptiles of Madagascar, Second Edition. Cologne, Germany: Vences & Glaw Verlag / Serpents Tale. 480 pp. .

Pseudoxyrhophiidae
Reptiles of Madagascar